Njisane Nicholas Phillip (born 29 May 1991) is a Trinidadian cyclist. Born in Siparia, he competed at the 2012 Summer Olympics, the 2014 and 2018 Commonwealth Games.

Palmarès

2009
 1st Trinidad and Tobago National Championships – Junior road race
2010
 Central American and Caribbean Games
 1st Sprint
 3rd Team sprint
 Pan American Road and Track Championships
 3rd Team sprint
2011
 US Grand Prix of Sprinting
 1st Sprint
 1st Keirin
 Pan American Games
 3rd Sprint
2012
 Pan American Road and Track Championships
 1st Sprint
 Summer Olympics
 4th Sprint
2013
 1st Goloconda – Chase Village
 1st Keirin, Madison Cup
 1st Sprint, Challenge International sur piste
 Fastest Man on Wheels
 1st Sprint
 2nd Keirin
 2nd Sprint, Round 1 – Manchester, 2013–14 UCI Track Cycling World Cup
3rd Sprint, US Grand Prix of Sprinting

References

Trinidad and Tobago male cyclists
1991 births
Living people
Olympic cyclists of Trinidad and Tobago
People from San Fernando, Trinidad and Tobago
Cyclists at the 2012 Summer Olympics
Cyclists at the 2016 Summer Olympics
Cyclists at the 2010 Commonwealth Games
Cyclists at the 2014 Commonwealth Games
Commonwealth Games competitors for Trinidad and Tobago
Cyclists at the 2011 Pan American Games
Cyclists at the 2015 Pan American Games
Pan American Games silver medalists for Trinidad and Tobago
Pan American Games bronze medalists for Trinidad and Tobago
Pan American Games medalists in cycling
Central American and Caribbean Games gold medalists for Trinidad and Tobago
Central American and Caribbean Games silver medalists for Trinidad and Tobago
Competitors at the 2010 Central American and Caribbean Games
Cyclists at the 2019 Pan American Games
Central American and Caribbean Games medalists in cycling
Medalists at the 2011 Pan American Games
Medalists at the 2015 Pan American Games
Cyclists at the 2018 Commonwealth Games
Competitors at the 2018 Central American and Caribbean Games